Bracca subfumosa is a moth of the  family Geometridae. It is found in Borneo and Sumatra.

External links
The Moths of Borneo

Boarmiini
Moths described in 1897